Bowsden is a village and civil parish in Northumberland, England.

Landmarks
The causeway is a Roman road which starts at Port Gate on Hadrian's Wall, north of Corbridge, and extends  northwards across Northumberland to the mouth of the River Tweed at Berwick-upon-Tweed.

References

External links

Bowsden homepage
Northumberland Communities (Accessed: 5 November 2008)

Villages in Northumberland